Sasamat Lake is located within Belcarra Regional Park in Port Moody, British Columbia. It is one of the warmest lakes in Greater Vancouver. At the south end of the lake there is a floating bridge, used for fishing or swimming. At the north end of the lake is White Pine Beach. Seasonal transit service is provided by TransLink to White Pine Beach.

Port Moody
Lakes of the Lower Mainland
New Westminster Land District